The Levriero Sardo is a very rare breed of dog originating in Sardinia. Few specimens exist, but some Sardinian breeders are dedicated to the breed. Locally, the breed is also called , which roughly translates to "little hunting dog."

See also
 Dogs portal
 List of dog breeds

References

External links
 The Rare Sardinian Sighthound

Dog breeds originating in Italy
Sighthounds
Rare dog breeds